Mustafa Hijri is an Iranian-Kurdish politician who is the current leader of the Democratic Party of Iranian Kurdistan (KDPI).

Political life
Born in 1945 in the West Azarbaijan Province of Iran, Hijri graduated from the Teachers' College of Agriculture in Urumieh in 1963 and took up a post as a secondary school teacher in Saqqez. In 1970, he started studying Persian literature at Tehran University, where he obtained a bachelor's degree. On returning to his home town, he restarted teaching at the secondary schools and a college here. Playing a considerable role in the mass demonstrations held in 1978 against the Shah's regime where he won 90% of the votes, but the results, as in any electoral regions of Kurdistan, were announced null and void by the newly established Islamic Republic of Iran.

Participating in the 4th Congress of the PDKI in 1979, he was elected as a member of the Central Committee, and a few months later, chosen as a member of the Political Bureau, holding steadily on his heavy task ever since Dr. Abdul Rahman Ghassemlou was assassinated on July 13, 1989. Following the death of Dr. Ghassemlou, and on late Dr. Sadegh Sharafkandi’s appointment's as General Secretary, Hijri was once more chosen to the membership of the Political Bureau, and Vice-General Secretary.

Dr. Sharafkandi having been killed on Sept. 17, 1992, Hijri was appointed as General Secretary, continuing his duty up till 1995, when the 10th Congress of the Party was convened, whereupon successfully carrying out his duties. After the above-mentioned date till the 12th Congress of the party in December 2000, he was chosen as a member of Political Bureau and elected afterwards as the Vice-General Secretary.

Since the 12th Congress up to the 13th Congress he unremittingly carried out his duties as a member of Political Bureau. He promotes federalism as a model for governance and power sharing in Iran. In his view, federalism must be based on geography and ethnicity, and this helps in resolving grievances of different ethnic groups in Iran. In addition, he attempted to push for coexistence between Kurds and Azerbaijanis in northwestern Iran. He was reelected to the position of General Secretary in the 14th Congress of PDKI held in September 2008.

References

1945 births
Living people
Democratic Party of Iranian Kurdistan politicians
People from West Azerbaijan Province